The 2020 Delaware Democratic presidential primary took place on July 7, 2020 as part of the Democratic Party presidential primaries for the 2020 presidential election. It was originally going to take place on April 28, 2020 and then June 2, 2020. It would have been one of several northeastern states that voted in what has been dubbed the "Acela primary" in reference to the namesake Amtrak service. The Delaware primary is a closed primary, with the state awarding 32 delegates, of which 21 are pledged delegates allocated on the basis of the results of the primary.  Biden, who represented the state in the Senate for three and a half decades, swept the delegates in this primary.

Procedure
Voting is expected to take place throughout the state from 7:00 a.m. until 8:00 p.m. In the closed primary, candidates must meet a threshold of 15 percent at the city and county or statewide level in order to be considered viable. The 21 pledged delegates to the 2020 Democratic National Convention will be allocated proportionally on the basis of the results of the primary. Of the 21 pledged delegates, between 1 and 6 are allocated to each of the state's 3 counties and Wilmington and another 2 are allocated to party leaders and elected officials (PLEO delegates), in addition to 4 at-large pledged delegates. These delegate totals do not account for pledged delegate bonuses or penalties from timing or clustering.

On Saturday, May 9, 2020, delegate selection caucuses was planned to be held in Delaware, following representative district-level caucuses in March where delegate selection caucus delegates would have been chosen. National convention subdivision-level delegates will be chosen during this process, as well as the 4 pledged at-large and 2 PLEO delegates to send to the Democratic National Convention. The 21 pledged delegates Delaware sends to the national convention will be joined by 11 unpledged PLEO delegates (6 members of the Democratic National Committee; all 3 members of Congress, including both Senators and one U.S. Representative; the governor; and, notably, former vice president Joe Biden).

In addition to delaying in-person voting from April 28, 2020 to June 2, 2020 to July 7, 2020, the requirements for using a mail-in absentee ballot have been broadened to include voters who wish to follow public health guidelines for self-quarantine or social distancing even if they are experiencing no symptoms.

Candidates
Joe Biden
Bernie Sanders (withdrawn)
Elizabeth Warren (withdrawn)

Polling

Results

Results by county
Favorite son Joe Biden overwhelmingly won all three counties; 73% of Sanders's votes came from New Castle County.  Sanders failed to break the 15% threshold in any constituency, leading to a Biden sweep of delegates.  Just over three percent of votes went to Elizabeth Warren, who had withdrawn from the race in March.

Notes

References

External links
The Green Papers delegate allocation summary
Delaware Democratic Party delegate selection plan

Delaware Democratic
Democratic primary
2020
Delaware Democratic